Supercar Megabuild is a UK-based Entertainment program aired on the National Geographic Channel. It follows the work of independent car designers Afzal Kahn (Season 1) and Alex Prindiville (Season 2) (former owner of Prindiville PLC) as they task two mechanics to design and build cars to meet their clients' specifications. In the first season Ralph Hosier and Ranen Rudra are the engineers; while in Season 2, Shane Lynch and Dan Baruffo perform those roles.

Plot

Season 1 
Afzal Kahn hires two professional engineers to create challenging one-off and prototype cars in very short timescales. Ralph and Ranen are both free-thinking engineers, which results in unique solutions that Mr. Kahn does not always like to start with. Ralph and Ranen sometimes have to travel to other countries to learn something new.

Season 2 

Season 2 has Alex Prindiville, owner of Prindiville PLC, replacing Afzal Kahn. Prindiville employs professional racing driver & mechanic Shane Lynch and master builder Dan Baruffo to modify cars to meet his specifications.

Episodes

Season 1

Season 2

References

National Geographic Channel UK site
Shine North TV
Kahn Design Website

National Geographic (American TV channel) original programming